Bodo Bittner (2 February 1940 – 23 September 2012) was a West German bobsledder who competed in the late 1970s. He was born in Berlin. He won the bronze medal in the four-man event at the 1976 Winter Olympics in Innsbruck.

References

 Bobsleigh four-man Olympic medalists for 1924, 1932–56, and since 1964
 Bodo Bittner at Sports-Reference.com

1940 births
2012 deaths
Sportspeople from Berlin
Bobsledders at the 1976 Winter Olympics
German male bobsledders
Olympic bobsledders of West Germany
Olympic bronze medalists for West Germany
Olympic medalists in bobsleigh
Medalists at the 1976 Winter Olympics